Udayaravichandrika is a rāgam in Carnatic music (musical scale of South Indian classical music). It is an audava rāgam (or owdava rāgam, meaning pentatonic scale ). It is a janya rāgam (derived scale), as it does not have all the seven swaras (musical notes). Closer to Udayaravichandrika in Hindustani music is Dhani aka Gaundgiri. But Dhani has N2 while Udayaravichandrika N3 in theory.

Structure and Lakshana 

Udayaravichandrika is a symmetric rāgam that does not contain rishabham or dhaivatam. It is a pentatonic scale (audava-audava rāgam in Carnatic music classification – audava meaning 'of five') and is equivalent to the minor pentatonic scale in Western music.
Its  structure (ascending and descending scale) is as follows (see swaras in Carnatic music for details on below notation and terms):

The notes used in this scale sadharana gandharam, shuddha madhyamam, panchamam and kaisiki nishadham. Udayaravichandrika is considered a janya rāgam of Kharaharapriya, the 22nd melakarta rāgam, though it can be derived from other melakarta rāgams, Hanumatodi, Natabhairavi or Natakapriya, by dropping both rishabham and dhaivatam.

Udayaravichandrika and the raga Suddha Dhanyasi are closely related, so much that many performers treat the two as interchangeable. Some contemporary practitioners consider Suddha Dhanyasi as more inflected (i.e., using more gamakas), and Udayaravichandrika to be more in the Hindustani tradition with almost bare (i.e., uninflected) notes. Puritans, however, refer to the fact that Udayaravichandrika is an ancient raga in the Venkatamakhin tradition and was reputed to be created by Muthuswamy Dikshitar himself. However, at that time, it had kakali nishadam rather than the kaisiki nishadam of Suddha Dhanyasi.

However, the Kaisaki nishadam is used in this topic making more towards Sudha Dhanyasi.  The Udaya Ravichandrika, in its pure
form should have the following arohana and avarohana:
 arohanam      = 
 avarohanam    = 

In recent years this distinction seems to have blurred, and both ragas are considered roughly equivalent.

Popular compositions 
Here are some popular kritis composed in Suddha Dhanyasi raga.

Enta nerchina by Thyagaraja
subrahmaṇyena rakṣito'haṃ and śrī pārthasārathinā by Muthuswami Dikshitar
Himagiri tanaye by Muthiah Bhagavatar
Bhavamu lona, Vinaro Bhagyamu by Annamacharya
Narayana Ninna Namada, Chandava Nodire Gokula by Purandara Dasa
Ishtu dina By Kanaka Dasa
śrī hari-vallabhē by Mysore Vasudevachar
śarvaṃ samāśraye'haṃ by Tulasivanam (pen-name of Ramachandran Nair from Kerala, India)
khēlati piṇḍāṇḍē bhagavān by Sadasiva Brahmendra
kālātītāya khaṭvāṅginē namastē by Muthiah Bhagavatar
bhēruṇḍāmbē bēḍuvē by Muthiah Bhagavatar
āyar pāḍi kaṇṇā by Padma Viraraghavan
pālaya māṃ siddhi vināyaka by Mysore Sadashiva Rao

Film songs

Language: Tamil

Language: Malayalam

Language: Kannada

Language: Telugu

Related rāgams 
This section covers the theoretical and scientific aspect of this rāgam.

Graha bhedam 
Udayaravichandrika's notes when shifted using Graha bhedam, yields four other major pentatonic rāgams, namely, Mohanam, Hindolam, Madhyamavathi and Shuddha Saveri. Graha bhedam is the step taken in keeping the relative note frequencies same, while shifting the shadjam to the next note in the rāgam. See Graha bhedam on Mohanam for more details and illustration of this concept.

Scale similarities 
Dhanyāsi is a rāgam which has the ascending scale of Udayaravichandrika (Shuddha Dhanyasi) and descending scale of Hanumatodi. Its  structure is : 
Abheri is a rāgam which has the ascending scale of Udayaravichandrika and descending scale of Kharaharapriya. Its  structure is :

Notes

References

Janya ragas
Janya ragas (kharaharapriya)